Torres State Park may refer to:

Guarita State Park, a state park in Torres, Rio Grande do Sul, Brazil
Itapeva State Park, a state park in Torres, Rio Grande do Sul, Brazil